I Killed the Count is a 1939 British mystery film directed by Frederic Zelnik and starring Ben Lyon, Syd Walker, Terence de Marney. It was shot at Highbury Studios.

Synopsis
Cockney comedian Syd Walker plays it more or less straight as Scotland Yard Detective Inspector Davidson, at present trying to determine who murdered the much-hated Count Mattoni (Leslie Perrins). The dilemma isn't that the Detective is suffering from a lack of witnesses. In fact, four different people come forth to confess to the killing – each of them with plenty of motive and opportunity.

Cast
 Ben Lyon as Bernard Froy
 Syd Walker as Detective Inspector Davidson
 Terence De Marney as Detective Sergeant Raines
 Barbara Blair as Renée la Lune
 Athole Stewart as Lord Sorrington
 Antoinette Cellier as Louise Rogers
 Leslie Perrins as Count Mattoni
 David Burns as Diamond
 Ronald Shiner as Mullet
 Aubrey Mallalieu as Johnson
 Kathleen Harrison as Polly
 Gus McNaughton as Martin

References

Bibliography
Low, Rachael. Filmmaking in 1930s Britain. George Allen & Unwin, 1985.
Wood, Linda. British Films, 1927–1939. British Film Institute, 1986.

External links
 

1939 films
1939 mystery films
Films set in London
Films shot at Highbury Studios
British mystery films
1930 mystery films
Films directed by Frederic Zelnik
British films based on plays
1930s English-language films
1930s British films